If You Could See Inside Me is an American Hip-hop music album, and it is the fifth and final studio album by A Lighter Shade of Brown. It was released on August 10, 1999 through Associated Records. Production was handled by One Dope Mexican,Julio G, Tony G and DTTX. It features guest appearances from A.L.T., Jay Tee, Kid Frost and Steve Wilcox.

Track listing
"Next To Ball"- 3:43
"Major League"- 4:26
"JD Interlude"- 0:56 (featuring Steve Wilcox)
"Presidential"- 4:22 (featuring Kid Frost and Jay Tee)
"Hardcore Spirits"- 4:36 (featuring A.L.T.)
"If You Could See Inside Me"- 4:01
"Gonna Give It To You"- 3:54
"Sunny Day"- 4:32
"Party Don't Start"- 4:26
"Paradise"- 4:16
"(Hidden Track)"

References

External links

1999 albums
A Lighter Shade of Brown albums